Cummins is a town on Eyre Peninsula in South Australia, 67 km north of Port Lincoln and 60 m above sea level.  At the 2011 census, the town had a population of 719.

Cummins was named after William Patrick Cummins, a member of the South Australian House of Assembly from 1896 to 1907. The town of Cummins was developed in 1910 a few years after the first settlers in the area arrived. The railway to Port Lincoln arrived in 1907. The bounded locality of Cummins includes the former railway sidings of Pillana (south of the town) and Wildeloo (north of it).

The major industries are sheep farming and cereal grain growing. There was a junction of the narrow gauge Eyre Peninsula Railway within the town. The railway facilitated transfer of grain to the deep-water port at Port Lincoln, primarily for export till operation of the railway was discontinued on 21 May 2019. The Tod Highway and Bratten Way intersect at Cummins. A large grain storage and transshipment facility lies on the southern outskirts of town.

Cummins is the headquarters of the District Council of Lower Eyre Peninsula. It is in the state electoral district of Flinders and the federal Division of Grey.

The town has a bowls club with 3 greens which competes in the Southern Eyre Peninsula Men's Bowling Association.

Cummins is the birthplace of former Australian tennis player John Fitzgerald who in a career spanning 1980-1997 won seven Grand Slam Doubles titles at all four major events (Australian Open (1982), French Open (1986, 1991), Wimbledon (1989, 1991), and the US Open (1984, 1991).

The Traditional custodians of the district were the Nawu people.

References

Towns in South Australia
Eyre Peninsula